Asociación Civil Impacta Salud y Educación is a non-profit organization which promotes public health in the Andean region of Peru.

Established en 2000, Asociación Civil impacta Salud y Educación is a Peruvian non-governmental organization dedicated to clinical, biomedical and public health research as it relates to the health and human development in the fields of HIV/AIDS and other sexually transmitted infections.

Mission
We are a non-profit organization dedicated to health and human behavior research by means of a multidisciplinary staff committed to the promotion of the wellbeing of individuals and society. We aim to achieve permanent advancements in knowledge that contribute to the expansion of development alternatives, health and education in the benefit our study populations and the general community.

Vision
Impacta will be recognized by its staff, clients and funding sources as well as the general public as the premier institution for scientific investigation in the Andean Region. Impacta will be identified as the reference center for biomedical investigations, the promotion of sexual health and the advancement of community education. Institutional values such as honesty, tolerance, respect for others and the cultivation of intellectual curiosity are the essence or our organizational approach.

Conducting investigation and generating knowledge
The impact of the HIV/AIDS epidemic, which is rapidly and relentlessly expanding in developing countries, is reaching unprecedented dimensions. With the aim of taking advantage of investigations, helping combat the HIV/AIDS epidemic and assisting health care systems respond to numerous and complex health problems, it is necessary to focus on knowledge-generation and information exchange from an innovative perspective. In this context it is essential that treatment, prevention and epidemic control initiatives benefit from the most recent advancements and the most relevant experiences. Investigations are necessary so that the decisions made are evidence-based. Study findings are provided to programs and projects that combat HIV/AIDS and must be in accordance with the local circumstances and realities.
Impacta’s principal activities are the generation of scientific knowledge and the search for the best ways to enhance health conditions at a population level. In this manner, Impacta conducts a range of studies in collaboration with both national and international institutions as well as with the private and public sectors.

"It is essential that treatment, prevention and epidemic control initiatives benefit as much from the most recent scientific advancements as from the latest and most relevant experience acquired…"

Prevention research
More rigid tests are needed in order to prevent HIV infection as it relates to the promotion of preventive behaviors between different populations. This represents a major challenge in the context of increasing access to anti-retroviral treatment.
More information is needed in order to determine the point at which data from developed countries are valid in countries that are developing or with limited resources.
IMPACTA conducts projects that are directed at evaluating HIV prevention interventions as part of international research initiatives such as the HIV Prevention Trials Network.

Vaccine research
Although advances have been achieved both in the prevention and treatment of HIV/AIDS, the greatest hope is in discovery of a safe and effective vaccine. The development of an HIV vaccine faces numerous scientific challenges. Knowledge of protective immunity and antigens needs to expand as well as ways to confront HIV’s wide genetic diversity.
In this area, Impacta has stood out as a leader in the implementation of the first preventive HIV vaccine studies in Perú. This lead role is sustained by the extensive preparation of study staff as well as strong community links. Impacta is the Peruvian site for the HIV Vaccine Trials Network.

"the greatest hope is in discovery of a safe and effective vaccine".

Treatment research
Basic science and the study of the pathogenesis of AIDS are important parts of the design and development of new drugs and innovative therapeutic strategies. The advent of potent antiretroviral drug combinations has provided a drastic reduction in HIV morality, principally in developed countries.
As a result of the dissemination of highly active antiretroviral therapy, it has also been shown that it is necessary to address problems related to medication adherence and toxicity, immunological failure and the emergence of resistance and co-infections.
Impacta’s study clinic and multidisciplinary staff are trained to provide specialized medical attention to people living with HIV/AIDS as well as confronting the challenges inherent in the implementation of treatment studies. Impacta is the Peruvian site of the AIDS Clinical Trials Group.

"It´s vital to reinforce prevention in order to protect future generations, but is also necessary to expand antiretroviral treatment (…) A holistic approach in the fight against HIV/AIDS joins prevention, treatment, care and the support of people living with HIV/AIDS."

Operational Research
Operational research covers a wide range of focus areas and disciplines that support the design and improvement of systems that makes accessible effective prevention, treatment and care options and, with time, vaccines.
Impacta has a special interest in: finding the best ways in which to supervise treatment in resource-limited environments; the interactions of HIV with other STI; the advancement of programs to monitor resistance to antiretrovirals; models for the creation of human resource; economic aspects; and the analysis of healthcare delivery systems, to name a few.
"“Operations studies help to involve and orient health services providers to coordinate their respective roles (…) It is fundamental to obtain data about what works, what doesn’t work and the reasons for those data. In this way it assures that information as available as quickly as possible.”" (OMS, 2004).

Prevention and Control of HIV/AIDS
Although there still is no cure for AIDS, it is preventable and treatable. The majority of new HIV infections could be prevented if current prevention programs were expanded. Prevention initiatives could arrest the spread of HIV and important treatment advances could sustain the hope of a longer and better life for people that live with HIV. This area urgently needs the implementation and advancement of programs and projects in order to: prevent the sexual transmission of HIV/AIDS; prevent infection via breastfeeding and in children; break the links between HIV and other STI; provide voluntary testing and counseling; and reduce the health risks in infected persons as well as other approaches. 
Impacta promotes HIV/AIDS/STI prevention programs and projects, as part of its efforts directed at vulnerable populations, with the support of the Global Found for the Fight Against AIDS, Tuberculosis, and Malaria.
"“Prevention initiatives could arrest the spread of HIV and important treatment advances could sustain the hope of a longer and better life for people that live with HIV.”"

Partners
Asociación Civil Impacta Salud y Educación collaborates with the University of Washington in various research projects.

References

External links
 Asociación Civil Impacta Salud y Educación (in Spanish)

Non-profit organisations based in Peru